Events from the year 1554 in Ireland.

Incumbent
Monarch: Mary I

Events
April 14 – George Dowdall, Archbishop of Armagh, is commissioned to deprive married clergy of their offices.
May 13 – the Earldom of Kildare is revived in favour of Gerald FitzGerald, 11th Earl.
June 29 – Edward Staples, Bishop of Meath, is deprived of his office as being a married priest. The Cistercian William Walsh is appointed to succeed him on 22 November by letters patent.
Gerald FitzGerald, Earl of Kildare and Richard Nugent, Baron Delvin, campaign against Phelim Roc O'Neill of Clandeboye.
John Bathe is appointed Chief Justice of the Irish Common Pleas following the death of Sir Thomas Luttrell.
Barnaby Skurloke or Skurlog is appointed Attorney-General for Ireland, the first use of the title in place of King's Attorney.

Births
Approximate date – Richard Field, Jesuit (d. 1606)

Deaths
Cahir mac Art Kavanagh, Lord of St. Molyns, baron of Ballyann.
Sir Thomas Luttrell, lawyer (b. c.1490)

References

 
1550s in Ireland
Ireland
Years of the 16th century in Ireland